The 2014–15 Lowland League was the second season of the Lowland Football League, the fifth tier of the Scottish football pyramid system. The season began on 2 August 2014 and ended on 13 May 2015. Spartans were the defending champions. The league expanded to 14 teams with Edinburgh University and BSC Glasgow joining.

This was the first season in which promotion to Scottish League Two was introduced, with the champions taking part in the pyramid play-off against the Highland League champions and the winner then playing the bottom side in League Two. 

Edinburgh City won their first league title on 20 March 2015 after nearest rivals Whitehill Welfare lost at East Kilbride. As a result, they faced the winners of the 2014–15 Highland Football League (Brora Rangers) in the semi-finals of the League Two play-offs, losing on penalties after drawing 2-2 on aggregate and therefore remained in the Lowland League.

Teams

The following teams changed division prior to the 2014–15 season.

To Lowland League
 BSC Glasgow

Transferred from East of Scotland League Premier Division
 Edinburgh University

Stadia and Locations

League table

Results

Lowland League play-off
It was proposed that the winners of the 2014–15 East of Scotland Football League and 2014–15 South of Scotland Football League would play each another for a place in the Lowland League. However, this is subject to strict licensing and entry criteria which determined possible acceptance. As the play-off was not contested, Threave Rovers stayed in the division despite having finished bottom.

References

Lowland Football League seasons
5